Blanche Reverchon (16 May 1879 – 8 January 1974) was a French psychoanalyst.

References

1879 births
1974 deaths
Analysands of Rudolph Lowenstein
French psychoanalysts